Carlos Domínguez Cáceres (born 11 February 2001) is a Spanish professional footballer who plays as a centre-back for Celta de Vigo.

Career
A youth product of the RC Celta de Vigo academy, Domínguez was called up to join the senior team for the first time in early May 2021 due to a series of injuries in the first team. He made his professional debut with Celta Vigo in a 4–2 La Liga win over Villarreal CF on 9 May 2021.

References

External links

2001 births
Living people
Footballers from Vigo
Spanish footballers
Association football defenders
La Liga players
Primera Federación players
Segunda División B players
Celta de Vigo B players
RC Celta de Vigo players